A. petiolaris may refer to:

 Acacia petiolaris, a synonym for Acacia pycnantha, a tree species
 Azara petiolaris, the holly azara, a plant species

See also 

 Petiolaris (disambiguation)